Howard George (February 6, 1935 – February 24, 2010) was an American wrestler. He competed in the men's Greco-Roman light heavyweight at the 1960 Summer Olympics.

References

External links
 

1935 births
2010 deaths
American male sport wrestlers
Olympic wrestlers of the United States
Wrestlers at the 1960 Summer Olympics
Sportspeople from Watertown, New York